Mount Olive Township may refer to the following townships in the United States:

 Mount Olive Township, New Jersey
 Mount Olive Township, Macoupin County, Illinois